Michael Gilhooley (26 November 1894 – 17 May 1969) was a Scottish professional footballer who played as a centre-half. He represented Scotland once at international level.

Career
Born in Edinburgh but with much of his early life spent in Fife, Gilhooley played junior football for Glencraig Celtic, then played for Celtic, Abercorn, Vale of Leven, Clydebank, Hull City, Sunderland, Bradford City and Queens Park Rangers, before returning to junior football with Troon Athletic.

At Hull he made 67 league and 5 FA Cup appearances. At Sunderland he made 19 league appearances, having suffered a broken leg soon after joining the club.

He signed for Bradford City in May 1925, and left the club in May 1927. He made 52 appearances in the Football League for them, as well as 1 FA Cup appearance. He then moved to London with QPR, making 9 league appearances in his single season at Loftus Road.

Gilhooley earned one international cap for Scotland in 1922.

References

Sources

1894 births
1969 deaths
Scottish footballers
Scotland international footballers
Abercorn F.C. players
Celtic F.C. players
Vale of Leven F.C. players
Clydebank F.C. (1914) players
Hull City A.F.C. players
Sunderland A.F.C. players
Bradford City A.F.C. players
Queens Park Rangers F.C. players
Scottish Junior Football Association players
Scottish Football League players
English Football League players
Association football central defenders
Footballers from Edinburgh
Footballers from Fife
Glencraig Celtic F.C. players